The National Union of General Workers (NUGW) was an early general union in the United Kingdom, the most important general union of its era.

History
The union was founded in 1889 as the National Union of Gas Workers and General Labourers by Will Thorne, Ben Tillett and William Byford, following lay offs at Beckton gas works.  Thorne was elected as the General Secretary, a post he held throughout the life of the union, and successfully argued that the organisation should campaign for an eight-hour working day, rather than an increase in wages.  This demand was quickly won, and membership soon rose to over 20,000.

While the union organised members across the UK, its main areas of strength were London and Lancashire.  In London, Thorne was its best-known figure, followed by Pete Curran, Arthur Hayday, Jack Jones and Harry Picard, while in Lancashire its main figures were J. R. Clynes, Charles Dukes, Fleming Eccles and Arthur Seabury.  It also had significant numbers of members in the north east, organised by Hugh Lynas, and in Scotland, where it was organised by John McKenzie.  Its largest section of members worked in engineering, followed by gas workers, electricity supply, shipyard workers in the south of England and in Scotland.  Other industries in which it had a significant membership included the metal trades in Sheffield and Birmingham, aluminium, asbestos and cement works, brickmaking, quarrying, boxmaking, chemicals, rubber, leather, and food and drink manufacturing.

In 1916, the organisation renamed itself the "National Union of General Workers", merging with the Amalgamated Union of Machine and General Labourers.  Further mergers followed, principally with the British Labour Amalgamation, the Amalgamated Society of Gas, Municipal and General Workers, the Amalgamated Enginemen, Cranemen, Boilermen, Firemen and Wire Rope Workers Union and the National Federation of Women Workers.  This last merger was particularly significant, as it brought 30,000 women into the union.

Unlike many other unions, the NUGW only had a small staff at its headquarters, consisting of Clynes, Jones, Thorne and Will Sherwood, later joined by Margaret Bondfield from the National Union of Women Workers.

In 1924, the union joined with the National Amalgamated Union of Labour and the Municipal Employees Association to form the National Union of General and Municipal Workers.  Much of the leadership of the new union came from the NUGW, which adopted its districts.  Eccles, R. H. Farrah, Hayday, William E. Hopkin, Tom Hurley, Lynas, McKenzie, Walt Wood and S. J. Wright all continued in post as district secretaries, Thorne continued as general secretary, and Clynes as president, while Bondfield, Jones and Sherwood were appointed as assistant general secretaries.

Election results
The union sponsored Labour Party candidates in numerous Parliamentary elections, several of whom won election.

Presidents
1889: Mark Hutchins
1891: Will Watkinson
1894: Pete Curran
1910: J. E. Smith
1912: J. R. Clynes

References

1889 establishments in the United Kingdom
Trade unions disestablished in 1924
Defunct trade unions of the United Kingdom
GMB (trade union) amalgamations
Trade unions established in 1889
Trade unions based in London